Charles Orlanducci (born 28 October 1951 in Vescovato, Haute-Corse) is a French former professional footballer who played as a defender.

External links
 
 
 

1951 births
Living people
Sportspeople from Haute-Corse
French footballers
Footballers from Corsica
Association football defenders
France international footballers
SC Bastia players
Red Star F.C. players
Ligue 1 players